Kuh Mareh Sorkhi Rural District is a rural district (dehestan) in Arzhan District, Shiraz County, Fars Province, Iran. At the 2006 census, its population was 9,034, in 1,883 families.  The rural district has 29 villages.

References 

Rural Districts of Fars Province
Shiraz County